Johan Reinholdz (born 30 June 1980) is a progressive metal artist best known for his work with the Swedish progressive metal band Andromeda, Swedish death metal band NonExist and the melodic death metal band Skyfire. He composed Andromeda's debut album, Extension of the Wish. He has also released four more studio albums with Andromeda and one live-album. In 2004 he joined Skyfire on Esoteric in 2009. Since early 2017 he plays with Dark Tranquillity, going from live member to full time member in 2020, replacing original guitarist Martin Henriksson.

Biography 
Reinholdz was born on 30 June 1980 in Höör. He first picked up the guitar at the age of nine, inspired mainly by Kee Marcello and Europe. Later he discovered heavy metal by listening to bands such as Metallica, Megadeth, Sepultura, AC/DC, Iron Maiden, Slayer, Morbid Angel and Pantera. He then started playing with his friends in some local bands such as Morbid Demons, Widow, Dark Desires and Crimson Tears. Widow released three demos and played local gigs.

Over time, several more musical influences were added to his musical interest. Artists like Sisters of Mercy, Yngwie Malmsteen, The Cure, Allan Holdsworth, Yes, Emerson, Lake & Palmer, Dream Theater, Genesis, Atheist, Marillion, and classical music and jazz/fusion as well.

In 1998 he recorded two solo-demos which found their way to WAR-music (later reformed as New Hawen Records) boss Bengt "Wez" Wenedikter. Andromeda and Nonexist were then born as Wenedikter offered Reinholdz two record deals in 1999. Some of the riffs from the 1998 demo "Welcome to Forever" were used on Andromeda debut album Extension of the Wish and the bandname was lifted from the last track of the demo "A Postcard from Andromeda". Andromeda has released five studio-albums and one live-DVD. The band is currently writing songs for album number six which will be recorded early 2016. A second live-DVD - "Live in Vietnam" is also due to be released early 2016.

The first Nonexist album Deus Deceptor came out in 2002 and in 2011 Reinholdz started writing the second Nonexist album From My Cold Dead Hands. It was then recorded in 2011/2012 with Johan Liiva back on vocals, and released by Pivotal Rockordings in November 2012 and by Japanese label Trooper Entertainment in May 2013. This album was the debut as a producer for Reinholdz, doing all the mixing, producing and mastering himself. 
The band made their live-debut at the Scorched Tundra Festival in Gothenburg, December 2012. 
In 2014 Nonexist started recording album number three entitled Throne of Scars. It features nine tracks and is produced and mixed by Johan Reinholdz at Multipass Studios with the assistance of Markus Nilsson at Sunnanå Studio in Malmö. The style of the songs retain the atmosphere from the previous album; dark, intense, varied and heavy while also adding some new influences in the mix. Throne of Scars was mixed and ready in April 2015 and during the same time the band signed a deal with Danish label Mighty Music. The album was released in Japan by Trooper Entertainment, in August and in the rest of the world by Mighty Music on 10 October 2015. 
Reinholdz has now taken over the vocal-duties in Nonexist, doing both the guitar and vocals live. Johan Liiva quit the band in November 2015.

As of May 2019 Reinholdz is endorsed by Caparison Guitars

Guitars used 
Caparison Deliinger
Caparison Deliinger II FX Prominence
Caparison Brocken

Awards 

 Swedish Grammis - best metal/hard rock 2021 for Dark Tranquillity - Moment (2020, Century Media Records)

Placed at No. 11 of the 20 best guitarists of progressive metal by Prog-sphere.com 
Andromeda - II=I placed at No. 6 of the 50 best progressive metal albums of
the 2000s by Daadmagazine.com 

Andromeda - Extension of the Wish placed at No. 13 of the 50 best progressive metal albums of the 2000s by Prog-sphere.com

Discography

With Morbid Demons
Enter the Crypts of Hell (1993, demo)

With Widow
Beyond (1996, demo)
Will We Ever Know (1997, demo)
Autumn Elegy (1998, demo)

Solo
Maiden Voyage (1998, demo)
Welcome to Forever (1998, demo)
Solipsism (2021, Reinholdz Recordings)
Weightless and Numb (2022, Reinholdz Recordings)

With Andromeda
Extension of the Wish (2001, WAR-music/Century Media Records/NTS)
II=I (2003, New Hawen Records/Century Media)
Extension of the Wish - Final Extension (2004, New Hawen Records/Century Media Records)
Chimera (2006, Massacre Records)
Playing off the Board (Live DVD) (2007, Metal Mind Productions)
The Immunity Zone (2008, Nightmare Records)
Manifest Tyranny (2011, Inner Wound Recordings)
Live in Vietnam (Live DVD) (2016, Andromeda Recordings)

With Nonexist
Deus Deceptor (2002, New Hawen Records/Century Media Records/Toy's Factory)
From My Cold Dead Hands (2012, Pivotal Rockordings/Trooper Entertainment)
Throne of Scars (2015, Mighty Music/Trooper Entertainment)
The New Flesh EP (2016, Reinholdz Recordings)
Deus Deceptor (2017, Remaster/extended) (2017 Reinholdz Recordings)
In Praise of Death EP (2018, Mighty Music)
Like the Fearless Hunter (2020, Mighty Music)

With Opus Atlantica
Opus Atlantica (2002, Regain Records)

With Skyfire
 Fractal (2009, Pivotal Rockordings)
 Esoteric (2009, Pivotal Rockordings)
 Liberation in Death (2017, CFL Recordings)

With Murdered Beats
 Silent Order (2017, Reinholdz Recordings)

With Dark Tranquillity
 Moment (2020, Century Media Records)

Guest appearances
 Porr 00 - Detta är Sverige (demo) (2000) - guitar solo on "Offer"
 Anton - The Happy Prankster EP (2000, Mjäll/Slask Independent Media  ) - synth on "Junkland"
 Skyfire - Timeless Departure (2001, Hammerheart Records) - co-writing credits on "Fragments of Time"
 8 Point Rose - S/T (2010, Escape Music ) - guitar solo on "Endless Rage"
 #366: A Life Lived - Depressionism (2014, Records Union ) - remake/remix/guitars/bass/synths/vocals on "Bullet for Thee"
 Universal Mind Project - The Jaguar Priest (2016, Inner Wound Recordings) - guitar solo on "The Force of our Creation"
 Frayn - New (2016) - guitar solo on "Stray"
 Asymmetry - Fragility (2016) - guitar solo on "Civil War"
 F-Side Project - As One Entity (2017) - guitar solo on "Mastermind"
 Deathening - Antifascist Death Metal (2018, Rakamarow Records/Accelerator Records) - guitar solo on "Evil" and "Spineless Cowards" and guest vocals on "Dehumanization"
 Anton Johansson's - Nevertold Stories (2021, Lion Music) - guitar solo on "End of a Friend"

Other
 Music to Alice in Wonderland-play  (2013, Theatre Thea, Malmö, Sweden  )
 Betrayer - Too Loud (2013) - producer/engineer of the vocals on "In My Heart"
 Lynchland Members Mix#1 - "Sa Salas" (2016) - featured song on compilation. 
 Metallic Kitty - "Little Thunder" - guitar/bass/keyboards and the writing credits to the music - (2016)
 ''Film - Almtorget Crew - (2017), Directed by Henrik Möller-Klas Noll/Videodirekt - role as back-up thug

References 

1980 births
Swedish heavy metal guitarists
Living people
Progressive metal guitarists
Dark Tranquillity members
21st-century guitarists